Radway Green & Barthomley railway station was built by the North Staffordshire Railway (NSR) and served the small Cheshire communities of Radway Green, Oakhanger and Barthomley.

During the Second World War the station was the terminating point for many trains transporting workers to and from the nearby ROF Radway Green. This situation continued until a new station,  was built at the factory in 1942.

References
Notes

Sources

Disused railway stations in Cheshire
Railway stations in Great Britain closed in 1966
Railway stations in Great Britain opened in 1848
Former North Staffordshire Railway stations
Beeching closures in England